Smart City is a weekly radio show broadcast on National Public Radio stations across the United States. Smart City is a weekly, hour-long public radio interview show that takes an in-depth look at urban life, the people, places, ideas and
trends shaping cities. Our host, Carol Coletta, talks with national and
international public policy experts, elected officials, economists,
business leaders, artists, developers, planners and others for a
discussion of urban issues.

Host
Carol Coletta is president and CEO of CEOs for Cities and host and executive producer of the nationally syndicated public radio show Smart City Before moving to Chicago to head CEOs for Cities, she served as president of Coletta & Company in Memphis. In addition, she served as executive director of the Mayors’ Institute on City Design, a partnership of the National Endowment for the Arts, United States Conference of Mayors and American Architectural Foundation.

Format
The show consists of two interviews with guests on topics pertaining to city life, urbanism, architecture and public policy.  Regular segments include a  newsbrief from the assistant editor of Planetizen.com, Nate Berg, and a short essay from J. Walker Smith.  Occasionally, Smart City will air short, produced pieces on city life, events, or other items of interest. The show is pre-recorded, and aired at various times in various markets and is podcast.

Staff and contributors
Carol Coletta - host - executive producer
Scotty Iseri - producer - contributing editor
 Nate Berg - correspondent: Planetizen.com
 J. Walker Smith - contributor: City Views
Otis White: - former contributor

 
The show's theme was composed for the program by Robby Grant and Steve Selvidge.

References

External links
Official website
Smart City podcast RSS Feed 
Show Archive
Vending Machine Creators of the Smart City theme music. 
Producer Scotty Iseri
Planetizen.com Contributor Nate Berg

American variety radio programs
NPR programs
2001 radio programme debuts